Stondon is a civil parish located in the Central Bedfordshire district of Bedfordshire, England. The parish includes the settlements of Lower Stondon and Upper Stondon.

The name "Stondon" derives from the Saxon word meaning Stone Hill. The parish itself however was only created in 1985 after an amalgamation of the Lower and Upper Stondon civil parishes.

Stondon is mentioned in the Domesday Book. The entry is as follows: Standone: St Benedict's of Ramsey; Engelhere from Azelina, Ralph Tailbois' wife.

Its services consist of a golf club and bistro, several hairdressers, a transport museum, Stondon Lower School and more.

References

External links

  Stondon Village website
 Stondon Parish Council Website

Villages in Bedfordshire
Civil parishes in Bedfordshire
Central Bedfordshire District